C.I.D. Rajanna is a 1970 Indian Kannada-language film produced and directed by R. Ramamurthy, starring Rajkumar. The supporting cast features Rajasree, Premalatha, Dinesh, Ranga, Dwarakish and K. S. Ashwath. S. P. Balasubrahmanyam lent his voice to Rajkumar for the song Illi aaduva maatu Kannada which was his third and last lip sync song for Rajkumar after the two songs in Mr. Rajkumar which released few months prior to this movie.

Cast 
 Rajkumar as Rajanna
 Rajasree
 Premalatha
 Dinesh
 Ranga
 Dwarakish as Mallanna
 Kanchana
 K. S. Ashwath

Soundtrack 
The music of the film was composed by Satyam and lyrics for the soundtrack written by Chi. Udaya Shankar.

Track list

References

External links 
 

1970 films
1970s Kannada-language films
Films scored by Satyam (composer)
Films directed by R. Ramamurthy